The women's 3000 metres event  at the 1991 IAAF World Indoor Championships was held on 9 March.

Results

References

3000
3000 metres at the World Athletics Indoor Championships
1991 in women's athletics